Henri Collé (23 November 1893 – 13 November 1976) was a Swiss racing cyclist. He rode in the 1921 Tour de France.

References

External links
 

1893 births
1976 deaths
Swiss male cyclists
Place of birth missing
19th-century Swiss people
20th-century Swiss people